Pasta Pomodoro was an American chain of Italian restaurants. It started as a single restaurant in the Marina District of San Francisco, California in 1994, and subsequently grew to 30 restaurants in the San Francisco Bay Area, Los Angeles and Orange County. The company was headquartered in San Francisco.

In 2002, Wendy's International acquired a 25% stake in the company. The chain, including the Wendy's share, was acquired by two Bay Area "foodies" in early 2010.

On December 26, 2016, the company abruptly closed all 15 remaining restaurants in the chain, all in the San Francisco Bay Area. Its employees were notified of the closure via text message not to come into work because they had ceased all operations. The name was briefly revived as a pop-up virtual restaurant in San Francisco in late 2020.

See also
 List of Italian restaurants

References

Restaurants established in 1994
Restaurants disestablished in 2016
Restaurants in San Francisco
Italian-American culture in Los Angeles
Italian-American culture in San Francisco
Italian restaurants in the United States
Cuisine of the San Francisco Bay Area
Companies based in San Francisco
1994 establishments in California
2016 disestablishments in California
2010 mergers and acquisitions